The Satellite Award for Best Film Made for Television was one of the annual Satellite Awards given by the International Press Academy. In 2016, the IPA merged the TV miniseries and film categories.

Winners and nominees

1990s

2000s

2010s

2020s

References

External links
 Official website

Television Film